The Păltiniș (also: Păltinișul Mare) is a right tributary of the river Bâsca in Romania. It discharges into the Bâsca in the village Păltiniș.

References

Rivers of Romania
Rivers of Buzău County